"The Experiment" is the third television play episode of the second season of the American television series CBS Playhouse. Broadcast in February 1969 and it starred Michael Douglas (credited as "M. K. Douglas") as a young scientist who puts aside his liberal principles to work for a cutting-edge chemical company.

"The Experiment" was Michael Douglas's first television role is the only CBS Playhouse installment written by a woman, Ellen M. Violett, which earned her an Emmy award nomination.

References

External links 
 

1969 American television episodes
1969 plays
CBS Playhouse episodes